= Bullappanakoppa =

- Village
- Country: India
- State: Karnataka
- District: Dharwad

Government
  - Type: Panchayat raj
  - Body: Gram panchayat

Population (2011)
  - Total: 1,098

Languages
  - Official: Kannada
- Time zone: UTC+5:30 (IST)
- ISO 3166 code: IN-KA
- Vehicle registration: KA
- Website: karnataka.gov.in

Bullappanakoppa is a village in the Dharwad district of Karnataka, India.

== Demographics ==
As of the 2011 Census of India, there were 228 households in Bullappanakoppa and a total population of 1,098 consisting of 573 males and 525 females. There were 108 children aged 0–6.
